Below is the list of measuring instruments used in power engineering work.

See also
 E-meter

Power
 
Electronic test equipment
Measuring instruments